Cauarana iheringi is a species of beetle in the family Cerambycidae, the only species in the genus Cauarana.

References

Necydalinae
Monotypic Cerambycidae genera